The 2023 Rajasthan legislative assembly election is scheduled to be held in or before December 2023 to elect all 200 members of the state's Legislative Assembly. Ashok Gehlot is the current Chief Minister of the state.

Background 
The tenure of Rajasthan Legislative Assembly is scheduled to end on 14 January 2024. The previous assembly elections were held in December 2018. After the election, Indian National Congress formed the state government, with Ashok Gehlot becoming Chief Minister.

Schedule

Parties and alliances







Others

Candidates

See also
Third Gehlot ministry
Elections in Rajasthan

References

State Assembly elections in Rajasthan
Rajasthan
2023 State Assembly elections in India